Sreekantapuram Hospital is a 250-bed multi-specialty hospital situated at the heart of Mavelikara, Kerala, India.  It was established in 1947 by the late Dr. G.S. Thampi.  It was the late Dr. S. Sreekantan, (son of Dr. G.S. Thampi) who expanded the small clinic into a multi-specialty hospital.

Departments
Sreekantapuram Hospital has the following departments :
 General Medicine; General Surgery; Obstetrics & Gynaecology; Pediatrics; Cardiology; Orthopaedics; 
Neurology; Urology; Dermatology; Otorhinolaryngology; Ophthalmology; Psychiatry; Physiotherapy; Anesthesiology; Pain and Palliative care; Imageology

Facilities
Sreekantapuram Hospital provides the following facilities:
 Accident and Trauma Care
 Laproscopic Surgery
 Echocardiogram & TMT
 ICU and Neonatal ICU
 Whole Body CT Scan
 Fully Computerised Laboratory and Pharmacy
 X Ray
 Colour Doppler and Ultrasound Scanning

Sreekantapuram Hospital also has a Nursing School attached to it with an annual intake of 20 students. The institute is recognized by the Indian Nursing Council.

Sreekantapuram Hospital has BSNL (Bharat Sangar Nigam Ltd), FCI (Food Corporation of India), Ex-servicemen Contributory Health Scheme (ECHS), etc. as its corporate clients and is affiliated with all the major insurance companies.

Hospitals in Kerala
Hospitals established in 1947
1947 establishments in India
Buildings and structures in Alappuzha district